Portland Secondary School is a secondary school located in Mitchells Plain, Western Cape, South Africa.
Currently about 1300 students and a staff of 37.
Subjects offered at GET Level: English, Afrikaans, Mathematics, Natural Science, Economics Management Science, Social Science, Technology and Life Orientation.
Subject offered at FET Level: English, Afrikaans, Life Orientation, Mathematics/Mathematical Literacy, Physical Science, Life Science, History, Geography, Consumer Studies, Economics, Business Economics and Accounting.

The school has managed to phase out Afrikaans Home Language and English Additional Language by 2015

 opened in 1930

References

High schools in South Africa
Schools in Cape Town